Hugo Manuel Sabido Madeira (born 14 December 1979 in Oeiras) is a Portuguese former professional cyclist.

Major results

2003
 3rd Overall Volta ao Alentejo
1st Stage 3
2004
 2nd Time trial, National Road Championships
 2nd Overall Tour de Pologne
1st Stage 7
 10th Overall Volta ao Alentejo
1st Stage 2
2005
 1st Overall Volta ao Algarve
1st Mountains classification
1st Stage 5
2006
 6th Overall Tour de la Région Wallonne
 9th Overall Tour de Picardie
2007
 4th Overall Giro del Capo
1st Mountains classification
 4th Gran Premio Industria e Commercio Artigianato Carnaghese
 7th Overall Volta ao Distrito de Santarém
2008
 8th Overall Giro del Capo
2010
 7th Overall Volta a Portugal
2011
 1st Prologue Volta a Portugal
 2nd Time trial, National Road Championships
2012
 2nd Overall Volta a Portugal
 8th Overall Volta ao Alentejo
2013
 3rd Time trial, National Road Championships
2015
 1st  Sprints classification Vuelta a la Comunidad de Madrid

References

External links

1979 births
Living people
Portuguese male cyclists